The 2020 NHK Trophy was the sixth event in the 2020–21 ISU Grand Prix of Figure Skating, a senior-level international invitational competition series. It was held at Osaka Prefectural Kadoma Sports Center (Towa Pharmaceutical Ractab Dome) in Osaka, Japan on November 27–29. Medals were awarded in the disciplines of men's singles, ladies' singles, and ice dance.

Due to the ongoing COVID-19 pandemic, a large number of modifications were made to the Grand Prix structure. The competitors consisted only of skaters from the home country, skaters already training in the host nation, and skaters assigned to that event for geographic reasons. As a result, there were no entrants for the pair skating segment of the competition.

Entries 
The International Skating Union announced the preliminary assignments on October 1, 2020.

Changes to preliminary assignments

Results

Men 
Mitsuki Sumoto withdrew prior to the short program due to a fever.

Ladies

Ice dance

References 

2020 NHK Trophy
2020 in figure skating
2020 in Japanese sport
November 2020 sports events in Japan